William Harper may refer to:
 William Harper (South Carolina politician) (1790–1847), US Senator from South Carolina
 William Rainey Harper (1856–1906), first president of the University of Chicago 
William Harper (Louisiana politician), state senator (African-American officeholders during and following the Reconstruction era)
 William Edmund Harper (1878–1940), Canadian astronomer
 Bill Harper (baseball) (1889–1951), Major League Baseball pitcher
 Bill Harper (footballer, born 1897) (1897–1989), Scottish football goalkeeper (Hibernian, Arsenal, national team)
 Billy Harper (footballer, born 1897) (1897–1982), English footballer
 Billy Harper (footballer, born 1877) (1877–1947), English footballer
 Bill Harper (footballer, born 1900) (1900–?), Scottish football goalkeeper (Sunderland, Crystal Palace)
 William Harper (Rhodesian politician) (1916–2006), Royal Air Force pilot and Rhodesian politician
 Billy Harper (born 1943), American jazz saxophonist
 William Claude Harper (born 1944), American jewelry artist 
 William Harper (composer) (born 1949), American composer and photographer
 Bill Harper (soccer) (fl. 1968), Canadian soccer player (national team)
 Willie Harper (born 1950), former American football linebacker
 William Jackson Harper (born 1980), American actor
 William Harper Jr., pioneer aviator with the Wright brothers
 William Allen Harper, JFK assassination witness
 William A. Harper (1873–1910), Canadian-born artist
 Will Harper, a character on Eastenders
 Bill Harper, a character in Ambassador Bill

See also
 William Harpur (died 1574), merchant and Lord Mayor of London